Roman Pitsur (born November 7, 1980) is a Ukrainian footballer who plays with FC Ukraine United in the Ontario Soccer League.

Career 
Pitsur began his career in 2000 with FC Hazovyk-Skala Stryi in the Ukrainian Second League. In 2006, he played in the Ukrainian First League with FC Krymteplytsia Molodizhne, and later had stints with FC Enerhetyk Burshtyn, FC Stal Kamianske, and FC Arsenal Bila Tserkva. In 2017, he played abroad in the Canadian Soccer League with FC Ukraine United. In his debut season he assisted FC Ukraine in achieving a perfect season, and contributed a goal in winning the Second Division Championship. 

In 2021, he returned to play with Ukraine United in the Ontario Soccer League.

References 

1980 births
Living people
Ukrainian footballers
FC Hazovyk-Skala Stryi players
FC Krymteplytsia Molodizhne players
FC Enerhetyk Burshtyn players
FC Stal Kamianske players
FC Arsenal-Kyivshchyna Bila Tserkva players
FC Ukraine United players
Canadian Soccer League (1998–present) players
Association football forwards
Ukrainian First League players
Ukrainian Second League players